Brown-Kercheval House was a historic home located at Rockport, Spencer County, Indiana. The original section was built in 1853–1854, and was a -story, wood-frame Gothic Cottage style dwelling with Greek Revival style design elements.  It was originally a six-room house and subsequently expanded in 1880 and 1908 to a 14-room house.  A kitchen wing was added in 1954.  Also on the property was a contributing brick outbuilding. It was destroyed by fire in April, 1994.

It was listed on the National Register of Historic Places in 1973 and delisted in 1999.

References

Houses on the National Register of Historic Places in Indiana
Gothic Revival architecture in Indiana
Greek Revival houses in Indiana
Houses completed in 1854
Buildings and structures in Spencer County, Indiana
National Register of Historic Places in Spencer County, Indiana